VDK Gent Damesvolleybalteam is a volleyball team from Ghent, Belgium.

VDK Gent-Heusden was founded in 1990, after a merger between VDK Wondelgem, Nova Smash Sint-Amandsberg and VBK Heusden. The new club had men's and women's teams. In 1993, White Star Sint-Amandsberg and VOM Gentbrugge joined, and the name of the club was shortened to VDK Gent. The activities of Gent were split up in 1997. The women's teams became active under VDK Gent Damesvolleybalteam, the men's compartiment was named VDK Gent Herenvolleyteam.

The women's A squad currently plays in Liga A. They achieved promotion to the highest level for the first time in their history in 1995. It has won the Liga A, the Belgium Cup and the Supercup.

The team has also played several times in European competitions such as the Challenge Cup, CEV Cup and the CEV Champions League.

Honours

National competitions
  Belgian Championship: 1
2012–13

  Belgian Cup: 1
2008–09

  Belgian Supercup: 4
2009, 2011, 2013, 2015

Squad
Season 2016–2017, as of January 2017.

References

External links
Official site 

Belgian volleyball clubs
Sport in Ghent